Wadi Auja, also spelled Ouja, known in Hebrew as Nahal Yitav is a valley or stream ("wadi"), in the West Bank, originating near the Ein Samia spring and flowing to Al-Auja near Jericho before it runs into the Jordan River.

Name
"Al-auja" means "the meandering one". This should not to be confused with the Yarkon River in Israel which flows to the Mediterranean Sea in Tel Aviv, known in Arabic by the name "Nahr al-Auja". During World War I this coincidence led to the term of "the line of the two Aujas", referring to a strategic line connecting the two river valleys. The Hebrew name is based on the Israeli settlement Yitav, founded in 1970 on the northern river bank, next to the Palestinian village of Al-Auja. "Yitav" is an acronym for Yad Yitzhak Tabenkin.

Geography
Wadi Auja is 35 kilometers long and sets the boundary between the Desert and the eastern hillslopes of the West Bank. It has a drainage area of 200 square kilometers and descends from a height of approximately 1000 meters above sea level to -315 meters below sea level, where it flows into the Jordan River. The stream starts at Ein Samia, on the eastern slopes of Mount Hazor and flows eastward. Before its arrival to the Jordan Rift Valley, it forms a deep and steep gorge, some 3 kilometers long. In this area some waterfalls are formed. Ein Samia has been diverted to provide water to Ramallah, some 20 km away, providing around 30% of the city's needs, and leaving most of the Wadi dry throughout the year. The Auja Spring produces an estimated 9 million cubic metres of water annually, which creates a small oasis that attracts thousands of tourists a year, as well as providing for the farmers of Auja village.

Two ancient aqueducts built in Wadi Auja during the late Second Temple period (and refurbished in later generations) carried water from their source at ʻAin el Aûjah ("the crooked spring") to their respective destinations, the one termed Ḳanât el Manîl ("the canal of el Manil") which led to an outlet in the Jordan valley north of Jericho, and the other termed Ḳanât Farʻûn ("Pharaoh's canal"), thought to have brought water to the fortified town of Archelais.

The gorge section of the river is a natural reserve, where rows of precipitous cliffs are exposed and inside them a variety of rare birds of prey and perennial plants can be found.

History
The area was occupied by Israel in 1967.

Today, Wadi Auja is a route used by Palestinian hikers. It is quieter and more isolated than the popular routes hiking routes such as Wadi Qelt. The wadi is used by many Bedouin shepherds.

See also
 Jordan Valley

References

External links
Survey of Western Palestine, Map 15:    IAA, Wikimedia commons 

Wadis of the West Bank
Tourist attractions in the State of Palestine
Judaean Desert